HMS Holland 2 was the second Royal Navy submarine to be built, and the first to be given a non-secret launch, in February 1902.

She was the second of the Holland-class submarines. Holland No. 2 was laid down on 4 February 1901 and commissioned on 1 August 1902. She set the depth record for the British Holland-class, accidentally diving to 78 feet.

In December 1902 she sustained some minor damage after a current took her off course and she accidentally surfaced directly underneath a brigantine.

She was sold on 7 October 1913.

References

External links
 MaritimeQuest HMS Holland 2 Pages

Holland-class submarines
Royal Navy ship names
Ships built in Barrow-in-Furness
1902 ships